Jasper Iwema (born 15 November 1989 in Hooghalen, Netherlands) is a Dutch motorcycle rider. He previously competed in the 125cc World Championship, the FIM CEV Moto2 European Championship, the FIM CEV Moto3 Championship, the ADAC Junior Cup and the German IDM 125GP Championship.

Career statistics

Grand Prix motorcycle racing

By season

By class

Races by year
(key) (Races in bold indicate pole position; races in italics indicate fastest lap)

References

External links

1989 births
Living people
Dutch motorcycle racers
125cc World Championship riders
Moto3 World Championship riders
Moto2 World Championship riders
People from Midden-Drenthe
MotoE World Cup riders
Sportspeople from Drenthe